Brandon Coupe (born April 11, 1972) is a former professional tennis player from the United States. He enjoyed most of his tennis success while playing doubles. During his career, he won one doubles title. He achieved a career-high doubles ranking of world No. 62 in 1999.

During his time on tour, Coupe resided in Menlo Park, California.

ATP career finals

Doubles: 3 (1 title, 2 runner-ups)

ATP Challenger and ITF Futures finals

Doubles: 27 (11–16)

Performance timeline

Doubles

References

External links
 
 

American male tennis players
Sportspeople from Roseville, California
People from Menlo Park, California
Tennis people from California
Living people
1972 births